Parliamentary elections were held in the People's Socialist Republic of Albania on 12 November 1978. The Democratic Front was the only party able to contest the elections, and subsequently won all 250 seats. Voter turnout was reported to be 100%, with all but one of the country's 1,436,289 registered voters casting votes.

Results

References

Parliamentary elections in Albania
Albania
1978 in Albania
One-party elections
Single-candidate elections
Albania